Khalid Aït Taleb (born 1966 in Rabat) is a Moroccan medical professor and politician. He is currently the Minister of Health of Morocco.

Education 
Taleb holds a Doctor of Medicine from Mohammed V University.

Professional career
Since 2009, Aït Taleb acted as the head of department of visceral surgery at the Hassan II University Hospital Center in Fez, as well as its general director.

In 2016, he was elected president of the Alliance des CHU du Maroc.

Political career
Prior to his appointment as Minister of Health, Aït Taleb briefly served as the Acting Secretary General of the Ministry of Health, succeeding Hicham Nejmi, who was dismissed the previous month.

As part of a government reshuffling, Aït Taleb was appointed as the Minister of Health on 9 October 2019.

Aït Taleb has been recognized as among those managing the government's response to the COVID-19 pandemic. His management of the government's vaccination campaign, in particular concerning vaccine delivery, earned him criticism among the opposition and some of the media. He has also faced controversy linked to a fake Facebook page made in his name, which the Ministry of Health denied having any connection with.

Personal life
Aït Taleb is married and has two children.

References

1966 births
Moroccan surgeons
Health ministers of Morocco
Living people
People from Agadir
Mohammed V University alumni